Talita is a village and municipality in San Luis Province in central Argentina.

References

Populated places in San Luis Province